Justicia phyllocalyx is a plant species native to central South America (Bolivia, Brazil and Paraguay).

References

Acanthaceae
Flora of Bolivia
Flora of Brazil
Flora of Paraguay